MJE may refer to:

 Majkin Airport, Marshall Islands (IATA code MJE)
 Muskum language, spoken in Chad (ISO 639 code mje)